Surrender to All Life Beyond Form is the second studio album by Dark Castle.

The album was released in CD and vinyl form via Profound Lore Records. A 12" vinyl version was released through Brutal Panda Records, limited to 500 copies.

In support of this album, Dark Castle embarked on a summer tour of North America alongside YOB.

Track listing
 "Surrender to All Life Beyond Form" – 4:05
 "Stare into Absence" – 3:52
 "Create an Impulse" – 2:01
 "Seeing Through Time" – 4:43
 "Heavy Eyes" – 5:59
 "Spirit Ritual" – 3:22
 "To Hide Is to Die" – 2:34
 "I Hear Wind" – 3:54
 "Learning to Unlearn" – 3:19

Personnel
Stevie Floyd – vocals, guitar, bass, piano, artwork
Rob Shaffer – vocals, drums, guitar, bass
Blake Judd – vocals on "Learning to Unlearn"
Nate Hall – vocals on "Stare into Absence"
Mike Scheidt – vocals on "Spirit Ritual"
Sanford Parker – production, synthesizer, samples
Orion Landau – artwork, layout
Collin Jordan – mastering

References

2011 albums
Dark Castle (band) albums
Profound Lore Records albums